Quảng Bình University is a university established in 2006 after merging colleges with the Normal College in Đồng Hới city, the capital of Quảng Bình Province.

The university accepts entry exam candidate registers as of 2007. It provides education at university level of teacher's training (normal) (including maths, physics, chemistry, biology, literature, history, geology), law, business administration and English language.

External links
 Official Website of Quảng Bình University

University
Universities in Vietnam
Educational institutions established in 2006
Đồng Hới
2006 establishments in Vietnam